Ubbalamudugu Falls (also called Tada Falls) is a waterfall located near Oneness Temple and Sricity in the Tirupati district of India. It is a crystal clear waterfall falling from a height of 100-odd meters making it a glorious sight.

The falls are located in a dense forest called the Siddulaiah Kona. The relation to Shiva ensures that the festival of Maha Shivaratri is a common time for people to visit.

Trekking
Tada falls is becoming  famous among residents from Chennai for Trekking. You can park the Vehicle near Tada falls parking lot and follow the trail to trek to the Tada falls. Total trek is almost of 10 km through rough patches and rocky terrains. Novice hikers can trek along a 3 km long trail one way that snakes along a clear stream of water. Mid-level trekkers can go further up, climbing the boulders to reach the base of the falls. Though the trail can be a little exhausting, there are multiple water pools along the trail and the area has good green cover making it a pleasant hike.

References

Waterfalls of Andhra Pradesh
Geography of Tirupati district
Tirupati district
Waterfalls of India